Jonathan Hood (born December 23, 1985) is a former professional Canadian football defensive back who played in the Canadian Football League (CFL).

Amateur football
Hood played high school football in Mississauga for the Father Michael Goetz Gators, and played college football for the St. Francis Xavier X-Men and the Western Ontario Mustangs.

Professional football

Edmonton Eskimos
Hood was drafted 26th overall by the Edmonton Eskimos in the 2008 CFL Draft, but failed to stick with the team after spending seven weeks on the practice roster.

Hamilton Tiger-Cats
Hood was signed by the Hamilton Tiger-Cats on May 28, 2010.

Toronto Argonauts
On March 20, 2013, Hood signed with the Toronto Argonauts.

Post football career
As of 2017, Hood is teaching at the University of Guelph-Humber and also pursuing a Phd from the University of Western Ontario.

References

External links

Toronto Argonauts bio

1985 births
Living people
Canadian football defensive backs
Edmonton Elks players
Hamilton Tiger-Cats players
Sportspeople from Mississauga
Players of Canadian football from Ontario
St. Francis Xavier X-Men football players
Toronto Argonauts players
Western Mustangs football players